Sébastien Taofifénua (born 21 March 1992) is a French rugby union player. His position is Prop and he currently plays for Toulon in the Top 14. He began his career at USA Perpignan.

Personal life
Taofifénua is the son of Willy Taofifénua who used to play for FC Grenoble, and the younger brother of Romain Taofifénua, who also started his career with USA Perpignan.

References

External links
UBB profile

1992 births
Living people
French rugby union players
RC Toulonnais players
Rugby union props
French people of Wallis and Futuna descent
Rugby union players from Wallis and Futuna
France international rugby union players
People from Mont-de-Marsan
Sportspeople from Landes (department)
USA Perpignan players
Union Bordeaux Bègles players
Lyon OU players